John Rous, 1st Earl of Stradbroke (30 May 1750 – 27 August 1827), known as Sir John Rous, Bt, from 1771 to 1796 and as The Lord Rous from 1796 to 1821, was a British nobleman, race horse owner and Member of Parliament. He married Charlotte Maria Whittaker on 23 February 1792 at 11 Manchester Square, London, England.

Stradbroke was the son of Sir John Rous, 5th Baronet, and succeeded as sixth Baronet on his father's death in 1771. In 1780 he was elected to the House of Commons for Suffolk, a seat he held until 1796. The latter year he was raised to the peerage as Baron Rous, of Dennington in the County of Suffolk. In 1821 he was further honoured when he was made Viscount Dunwich, in the County of Suffolk, and Earl of Stradbroke, in the County of Suffolk. Lord Stradbroke owned a stud farm in Suffolk and won the 1815 2,000 Guineas with the colt Tigris.

Lord Stradbroke died in August 1827, aged 77, and was succeeded in his titles by his eldest son John. His second son, Henry John Rous, became an admiral in the Royal Navy and a renowned steward of the Jockey Club.

Notes

References
Kidd, Charles, Williamson, David (editors). Debrett's Peerage and Baronetage (1990 edition). New York: St Martin's Press, 1990,

External links

Peers of Great Britain created by George III
Peers of the United Kingdom created by George IV
Earls in the Peerage of the United Kingdom
Rous, John
1750 births
1827 deaths
British MPs 1780–1784
British MPs 1784–1790
British MPs 1790–1796
British racehorse owners and breeders
People from Mid Suffolk District